The Rural Municipality of St. Laurent is located in the Interlake Region of Manitoba and has Lake Manitoba as its western boundary and is serviced by Manitoba Highway 6. The community of St. Laurent lies within its boundaries.

The initial incorporation of the municipality took place on 25 May 1881. It functioned as a Local Government District from 1944 until 1974 when it regained RM status.

Communities
 Harperville
 Oak Point
 St. Laurent

Demographics 

References

 Manitoba Historical Society: Rural Municipality of St. Laurent
 Official website

St. Laurent